The WH Smith Literary Award was an award founded in 1959 by British high street retailer W H Smith. Its founding aim was stated to be to "encourage and bring international esteem to authors of the British Commonwealth"; originally open to all residents of the UK, the Commonwealth and the Republic of Ireland, it latterly admitted foreign works in translation and works by US authors.  The final three winners were Americans (Philip Roth, Donna Tartt and Richard Powers), and 2005 was the award's final year.

The "W H Smith Illustration Award" ran from 1987 to 1994.

The "W H Smith Mind-Boggling Book Award" for children's literature ran from 1993 to 1996.

W H Smith currently sponsors the National Book Awards Children's Book of the Year (the "British Children's Book Award" through 2009).

Winners
1959 Patrick White, Voss 
1960 Laurie Lee, Cider With Rosie 
1961 Nadine Gordimer, Friday's Footprint 
1962 J. R. Ackerley, We Think the World of You 
1963 Gabriel Fielding, The Birthday King 
1964 Ernst H. Gombrich, Meditations on a Hobby-Horse 
1965 Leonard Woolf, Beginning Again 
1966 R. C. Hutchinson, A Child Possessed 
1967 Jean Rhys, Wide Sargasso Sea 
1968 V. S. Naipaul, The Mimic Men 
1969 Robert Gittings, John Keats 
1970 John Fowles, The French Lieutenant's Woman 
1971 Nan Fairbrother, New Lives, New Landscapes 
1972 Kathleen Raine, The Lost Country 
1973 Brian Moore, Catholics
1974 Anthony Powell, Temporary Kings 
1975 Jon Stallworthy, Wilfred Owen 
1976 Seamus Heaney, North 
1977 Ronald Lewin, Slim: The Standardbearer 
1978 Patrick Leigh Fermor, A Time of Gifts 
1979 Mark Girouard, Life in the English Country House 
1980 Thom Gunn, Selected Poems 1950–1975 
1981 Isabel Colegate, The Shooting Party 
1982 George Clare, Last Waltz in Vienna 
1983 A. N. Wilson, Wise Virgin 
1984 Philip Larkin, Required Writing 
1985 David Hughes, The Pork Butcher 
1986 Doris Lessing, The Good Terrorist 
1987 Elizabeth Jennings, Collected Poems 1953–1985 
1988 Robert Hughes, The Fatal Shore 
1989 Christopher Hill, A Turbulent, Seditious and Factious People: John Bunyan and His Church 
1990 V. S. Pritchett, A Careless Widow and Other Stories 
1991 Derek Walcott, Omeros 
1992 Thomas Pakenham, The Scramble for Africa 
1993 Michèle Roberts, Daughters of the House 
1994 Vikram Seth, A Suitable Boy 
1995 Alice Munro, Open Secrets
1996 Simon Schama, Landscape and Memory 
1997 Orlando Figes, A People's Tragedy: The Russian Revolution – 1891–1924 
1998 Ted Hughes, Tales From Ovid 
1999 Beryl Bainbridge, Master Georgie 
2000 Melvyn Bragg, The Soldier's Return 
2001 Philip Roth, The Human Stain 
2002 Ian McEwan, Atonement 
2003 Donna Tartt, The Little Friend
2004 Richard Powers, The Time of Our Singing 
2005 Philip Roth, The Plot Against America

WH Smith Mind-Boggling Book Award
For a few years, W H Smith also offered a children's book award. The judges were children between nine and twelve, and the intention was to promote books which were "accessible to children in content and price, as well as offering a gripping read."

The winners were:

1993 Philip Ridley, Krindlekrax 
1994 Malorie Blackman, Hacker 
1995 Maggie Prince, Memoirs of a Dangerous Alien 
1996 Sharon Creech, Walk Two Moons

References

Commonwealth literary awards
Awards established in 1959
1959 establishments in the United Kingdom
Awards disestablished in 2005
2005 disestablishments in the United Kingdom
British fiction awards